Tiger Bay is a 1934 British film directed by J. Elder Wills and starring the Chinese-American actor Anna May Wong.

The film is about a  young Englishman abroad, Michael, who deliberately visits a tough Chinese  district of  Tiger Bay to test his strength. He falls in love with Letty at Lui Chang's nightclub and battles a protection racket. Meanwhile, Lui fends off Olaf and his cronies, who attempt to intimidate Fay and Lui.

Cast
 Anna May Wong as Lui Chang  
 Henry Victor as Olaf  
 Lawrence Grossmith as Whistling Rufus  
 Margaret Yarde as Fay  
 Rene Ray as Letty  
 Victor Garland as Michael  
 Ernest Jay as Alf  
 Wally Patch as Wally

External links 

1934 films
Films directed by J. Elder Wills
British black-and-white films
1934 drama films
British drama films
1930s English-language films
1930s British films